In mathematics, the Mersenne conjectures concern the characterization of a kind of prime numbers called Mersenne primes, meaning prime numbers that are a power of two minus one.

Original Mersenne conjecture
The original, called Mersenne's conjecture, was a statement by Marin Mersenne in his Cogitata Physico-Mathematica (1644; see e.g. Dickson 1919) that the numbers  were prime for n = 2, 3, 5, 7, 13, 17, 19, 31, 67, 127 and 257, and were composite for all other positive integers n ≤ 257.  Due to the size of these numbers, Mersenne did not and could not test all of them, nor could his peers in the 17th century.  It was eventually determined, after three centuries and the availability of new techniques such as the Lucas–Lehmer test, that Mersenne's conjecture contained five errors, namely two are composite (those corresponding to the primes n = 67, 257) and three omitted primes (those corresponding to the primes n = 61, 89, 107). The correct list is: n = 2, 3, 5, 7, 13, 17, 19, 31, 61, 89, 107 and 127.

While Mersenne's original conjecture is false, it may have led to the New Mersenne conjecture.

New Mersenne conjecture 
The New Mersenne conjecture or Bateman, Selfridge and Wagstaff conjecture (Bateman et al. 1989) states that for any odd natural number p, if any two of the following conditions hold, then so does the third:

 p = 2k ± 1 or p = 4k ± 3 for some natural number k.
 2p − 1 is prime (a Mersenne prime).
 (2p + 1)/3 is prime (a Wagstaff prime).

If p is an odd composite number, then 2p − 1 and (2p + 1)/3 are both composite. Therefore it is only necessary to test primes to verify the truth of the conjecture.

Currently, the known numbers for which all three conditions hold are: 3, 5, 7, 13, 17, 19, 31, 61, 127 . It is also a conjecture that no number which is greater than 127 satisfies all three conditions. As of February 2020 all the Mersenne primes up to 243112609 − 1 are known, and for none of these does the third condition hold except for the ones just mentioned.

Primes which satisfy at least one condition are
2, 3, 5, 7, 11, 13, 17, 19, 23, 31, 43, 61, 67, 79, 89, 101, 107, 127, 167, 191, 199, 257, 313, 347, 521, 607, 701, 1021, 1279, 1709, 2203, 2281, 2617, 3217, 3539, 4093, 4099, 4253, 4423, 5807, 8191, 9689, 9941, ... 

Note that the two primes for which the original Mersenne conjecture is false (67 and 257) satisfy the first condition of the new conjecture (67 = 26 + 3, 257 = 28 + 1), but not the other two. 89 and 107, which were missed by Mersenne, satisfy the second condition but not the other two. Mersenne may have thought that 2p − 1 is prime only if p = 2k ± 1 or p = 4k ± 3 for some natural number k, but if he thought it was "if and only if" he would have included 61.

The New Mersenne conjecture can be thought of as an attempt to salvage the centuries-old Mersenne's conjecture, which is false. However, according to Robert D. Silverman, John Selfridge agreed that the New Mersenne conjecture is "obviously true" as it was chosen to fit the known data and counter-examples beyond those cases are exceedingly unlikely. It may be regarded more as a curious observation than as an open question in need of proving.

Renaud Lifchitz has shown that the NMC is true for all integers less than or equal to 32582656 by systematically testing all primes for which it is already known that one of the conditions holds. His website documents the verification of results up to this number. Another currently more up-to-date status page on the NMC is The New Mersenne Prime conjecture.

Lenstra–Pomerance–Wagstaff conjecture 
Lenstra, Pomerance, and Wagstaff have conjectured that there are infinitely many Mersenne primes, and, more precisely, that the number of Mersenne primes less than x is asymptotically approximated by

where γ is the Euler–Mascheroni constant. 
In other words, the number of Mersenne primes with exponent p less than y is asymptotically

This means that there should on average be about  ≈ 5.92 primes p of a given number of decimal digits such that  is prime. The conjecture is fairly accurate for the first 40 Mersenne primes, but between 220,000,000 and 285,000,000 there are at least 12, rather than the expected number which is around 3.7.

More generally, the number of primes p ≤ y such that  is prime (where a, b are coprime integers, a > 1, −a < b < a, a and b are not both perfect r-th powers for any natural number r > 1, and −4ab is not a perfect fourth power) is asymptotically

where m is the largest nonnegative integer such that a and −b are both perfect 2m-th powers. The case of Mersenne primes is one case of (a, b) = (2, 1).

See also 
 Gillies' conjecture on the distribution of numbers of prime factors of Mersenne numbers
 Lucas–Lehmer primality test 
 Lucas primality test
 Catalan's Mersenne conjecture
 Mersenne's laws

References 

 Reprinted by Chelsea Publishing, New York, 1971, .

External links 
 The Prime Glossary. New Mersenne prime conjecture.

Conjectures about prime numbers
Unsolved problems in number theory
Mersenne primes